Frank Bathurst Edwards (6 September 1887 – 5 March 1983) was an Australian politician.

Life and career
Born in Bathurst, New South Wales, he was educated at Hutchins School and read Law at the University of Tasmania. From 1909 to 1912 he was a Rhodes Scholar at Merton College, Oxford.

Edwards was elected to the Tasmanian Legislative Council as the Independent member for Russell in 1921. He served until he was defeated in 1933; the following year he contested the Tasmanian House of Assembly as a Nationalist candidate for Darwin and was elected. He remained in parliament until his resignation in 1940.

References

1887 births
1983 deaths
Independent members of the Parliament of Tasmania
Nationalist Party of Australia members of the Parliament of Tasmania
Members of the Tasmanian House of Assembly
Members of the Tasmanian Legislative Council
People from Bathurst, New South Wales
20th-century Australian politicians
Alumni of Merton College, Oxford